Mary Cassidy is an Irish-born singer best known as the vocalist in bands Lulabox and Agnes.

In 2010 she collaborated with Chris Standring for the one-off project Blond.

References

External links
Blond official website
Lulabox on YouTube

Irish women singers
Year of birth missing (living people)
Living people
20th-century Irish women singers
Irish rock singers